INS Prahar  (Assault) was a  of the Indian Navy.

Operations
In October 1999, she helped the IGCS Tarabai to chase and capture a Panamanian-registered Japanese cargo ship carrying aluminum ingots, MV Alondra Rainbow, that had been hijacked by pirates off Indonesia. The operation took place off the coast of Kochi.

Collision
On 21 April 2006 INS Prahar collided with the container ship MV Rajiv Gandhi, and sank off the coast of Goa. No one was injured in the accident. The commanding officer of the ship, Lieutenant Commander Yogesh Tripathi was found guilty of negligence by an Indian Navy court-martial, and dismissed from service.

References

Veer-class corvettes
Corvettes of the Indian Navy
Ships sunk in collisions
Maritime incidents in India
Maritime incidents in 2006